Peter Vodanovich (born 6 February 2001) is a New Zealand racing driver. He currently competes in the U.S. F2000 National Championship with Jay Howard Driver Development.

Racing record

Career summary 

*Season still in progress.

Motorsports career results

American open-wheel racing results

U.S. F2000 National Championship 
(key) (Races in bold indicate pole position) (Races in italics indicate fastest lap) (Races with * indicate most race laps led)

References 

2001 births
Living people
New Zealand racing drivers
Toyota Racing Series drivers
U.S. F2000 National Championship drivers

M2 Competition drivers
Sportspeople from Auckland